Jesse Marsh (July 27, 1907 – April 28, 1966) was an American comics artist and animator.  His main claim to fame is his work on the early Tarzan and related books for Western Publishing that saw print through Dell Comics and later Gold Key Comics.  He was the first artist to produce original Tarzan comic books.  Up to that time, all Tarzan comics were reprints from the newspaper strips.  He also worked on the Gene Autry comic book for many years.

Prior to working for Western, he had worked for the Walt Disney Company, doing animation work for Make Mine Music and some Pluto cartoons as well.

He would turn the Tarzan series over to Russ Manning in 1965 due to failing health.

In 2009, Dark Horse Comics announced an archive reprint series of his work on Tarzan entitled Tarzan: The Jesse Marsh Years.

Collected editions
 Tarzan: The Jesse Marsh Years
 Volume 1 collects Four Color #134 and 161 and Tarzan #1–4, 256 pages, January 2009, 
 Volume 2 collects Tarzan #5–10, 224 pages, May 2009, 
 Volume 3 collects Tarzan #11–16, 240 pages, September 2009, 
 Volume 4 collects Tarzan #17–21, 232 pages, November 2009, 
 Volume 5 collects Tarzan #22–27, 240 pages, February 2010, 
 Volume 6 collects Tarzan #28–32 and Tarzan's Jungle Annual #1, 248 pages, August 2010, 
 Volume 7 collects Tarzan #33–38, 224 pages, November 2010, 
 Volume 8 collects Tarzan #39–43, 224 pages, February 2011, 
 Volume 9 collects Tarzan #44–46 and Tarzan’s Jungle Annual #2, 240 pages, May 2011, 
 Volume 10 collects Tarzan #47–51, 224 pages, December 2011, 
 Volume 11 collects Tarzan #52–56 and March of Comics #125, 224 pages, July 2012,

References

Further reading
Panels #2 (1981) contains a tribute and analysis of Marsh's work by Alex Toth.
Batmania #1 (1964) contains Russ Manning's analysis of Marsh's style. It was reprinted in Sense of Wonder #12 (1972).

External links 
 

1907 births
1966 deaths
20th-century American artists
American comics artists
Animators from Alabama
Disney comics artists
Golden Age comics creators
People from Florence, Alabama
Silver Age comics creators
Walt Disney Animation Studios people